Lucien Boldewijn (born November 3, 1971 in Paramaribo, Suriname) is a Dutch basketball player who played for Dutch league eredivisie club Rotterdam Challengers during the 2003-2006 seasons.

References

External links
 eurobasket.com profile

1971 births
Living people
Dutch men's basketball players
Surinamese emigrants to the Netherlands
Feyenoord Basketball players
Dutch Basketball League players
Sportspeople from Paramaribo